This is a list of the mayors of Lobos, Argentina.

From 1856 to 1887 there were 22 president administrators at the Lobos City Hall, the first of them being Juan Antonio Cascallares. In 1887 Juan José Caminos was named the first mayor of Lobos. The first mayor after the Argentine Dictatorship was José Ernesto Piccone. So far, Lobos has had 76 mayors.

City Hall Presidents:
 Juan Antonio Cascallares – 1856
 Mariano Atucha – 1858
 Mariano Atucha – 1859
 Marcos Noguera – 1860
 Gabino Cascallares – 1862
 Mariano Atucha – 1863
 Nicanor Arévalo – 1864
 Lorenzo Varela – 1865
 José M. Velarde – 1867
 Nicanor Arévalo – 1869
 José M. Villafañe – 1870
 Casimiro Villamayor – 1872
 Casimiro Villamayor – 1875
 Manuel Antonio Caminos – 1875
 Félix F. Arauz – 1876
 Eulogio Del Mármol (Procurador a/c) – 1877
 Nicanor Berro – 1878
 Justo S. Del Carril – 1879
 Julio C. Figueroa – 1880
 Blas Varela −1880
 Blas Varela – 1883
 Eulogio Del Mármol – 1886

Mayors:
 Manuel Antonio Caminos – 1887
 Nicanor Desiderio Berro – 1889
 Antonio E. Hiriart – 1891
 Juan Moore – 1892
 Adolfo C. Morales – 1893
 Eulogio Del Mármol – 1895
 Antonio E. Hiriart – 1897
 Francisco Villanueva – 1899
 Juan F. de Cieza – 1901
 Ernesto Hiriart – 1903
 Juan F. de Cieza – 1905
 Eulogio M. Berro – 1907
 Carlos E. Cucullu – 1915
 Eulogio M Berro – 1917
 Ernesto H. Hiriart (interventor) – 1917
 Antonio Lombardo – 1920
 Manuel Fraga (Comisionado no se hace cargo) – 1921
 Rosendo Fraga (Comisionado no se hace cargo) – 1921
 Eduardo Buchanan (Comisionado) – 1921
 Antonio Lombardo – 1922
 Enrique Ratti – 1924
 Vicente Amorena (Comisionado) – 1925
 Luis M. Varela (Comisionado) – 1926
 Enrique Ratti – 1927
 Manuel Fraga – 1928
 Juan Ratti – 1929
 Tomás B. Sarracino (Comisionado) – 1930
 Arturo Cardoner – 1932
 Juan Angueira (Comisionado) – 1940
 Francisco Mastropietro – 1942
 Amaro E. Vallejos (Comisionado) – 1943
 Arsenio Granillo Fernández – September 9, 1943 to October 9, 1944
 Gustavo S. Walter – October 10, 1944 to February 28, 1945
 Arsenio Granillo Fernández – March 1, 1945 to September 11, 1945
 Enrique A. Ratti – September 12, 1945 to January 28, 1946
 Bartolomé Boglioti – January 29, 1946 to February 15, 1946
 Gustavo S. Walter – February 16, 1946 to July 11, 1946
 Enrique A. Ratti – July 12, 1946 to February 1, 1948
 Rafael Laurenti – February 2, 1948 to April 30, 1948
 Enrique A. Ratti – May 1, 1948 to March 14, 1949
 Pedro Yannarella – March 15, 1949 to March 27, 1949
 Enrique A. Ratti – March 27, 1949 to March 15, 1950
 Nicolás I. Macchiarolli – March 15, 1950 to March 30, 1950
 Enrique A. Ratti – April 1, 1950 to July 16, 1950
 Silverio Abiuso – July 17, 1950 to April 30, 1952
 Máximo Giordano – May 1, 1952 to May 1, 1955
 Luis Oscar Ratti – May 1, 1955 to October 10, 1955
 Arturo Cardoner – October 11, 1955 to February 22, 1957
 Arturo F. Manenti – February 22, 1957 to March 17, 1957
 Arturo Cardoner – March 18, 1957 to June 24, 1957
 Arturo F. Manenti – June 25, 1957 to July 24, 1957
 Rogelio L. B. González – July 25, 1957 to April 30, 1958
 José Ernesto Dorsi – May 1, 1958 to January 13, 1959
 Víctor Manzioni – January 19, 1959 to February 1, 1959
 José Ernesto Dorsi – February 2, 1959 to February 1, 1960
 Víctor Manzioni – February 1, 1960 to March 4, 1960
 José Ernesto Dorsi – March 4, 1960 to July 11, 1960
 Miguel Angel Turdó – July 11, 1960 to August 30, 1962
 José Benito Mondragón – August 30, 1962 to January 4, 1963
 Domingo Canseco – January 4, 1963 to August 8, 1963
 Carlos Jáuregui – August 8, 1963 to October 12, 1963
 José Máximo Piccone – October 12, 1963 to June 28, 1966
 Luis Antonio Ortelli – June 30, 1966 to July 31, 1966
 Edmundo E. Kirk Moore – July 31, 1966 to December 1, 1969
 Abel Francisco Alejandro Culela – December 1, 1969 to May 25, 1973
 Rubén I. Sobrero – May 26, 1973 to March 24, 1976
 Guillermo Stutzbach – March 24, 1976 to May 4, 1976
 Gustavo Von Borowski – May 4, 1976 to May 19, 1976
 Rodolfo Durrie – May 19, 1976 to June 22, 1977
 Laurentino A. Otaduy – June 22, 1977 to December 11, 1983
 José Ernesto Piccone – December 11, 1983 to December 11, 1987
 Humberto Maglione – December 12, 1987 to December 10, 1991
 Manuel María Manín – December 10, 1991 to December 10, 1995
 Juan Erriest – December 10, 1995 to December 10, 1999
 Juan Erriest – December 10, 1999 to December 10, 2003
 Gustavo Sobrero – December 10, 2003 to December 10, 2007

Lobos
Lobos
Mayors of Lobos